The  are a French ice hockey team based in Chamonix, Haute-Savoie. They play in the country's top tier, the Ligue Magnus. For their inaugural 2016–17 season, they were known as Pionniers de Chamonix-Morzine.

History

Origins
In 2016, France's Ligue Magnus adopted an expanded schedule and cut its number of teams from 14 to 12. The league's two Haute-Savoie clubs, the Chamois de Chamonix and the Pingouins de Morzine-Avoriaz, decided to merge their respective professional teams in order to better face the economic and competitive challenges presented by the new setup. The result of that fusion was a joint team called the Pionniers, splitting its home games between Chamonix and Morzine-Avoriaz. The amateur sections remained separate and retained the Chamois and Pingouins names.

While both towns are located within the same department, they are not particularly close, with Chamonix nested in the Mont Blanc massif and Morzine-Avoriaz part of the Chablais region. Following negotiations between the two municipalities, it was agreed that Chamonix would be the united team's training base for its inaugural season, as well as the owner of its league franchise.

2016-17 season

The precarious balance between the two organizations was quickly challenged when the new Pionniers limped out of the gate to a dismal record.
Mid-February 2017, head coach Stéphane Gros was dismissed as the team was dead last in the standings. The move was not unexpected from a sporting standpoint, but it further aggravated the Morzine-Avoriaz side as Gros had career ties to both clubs, while his replacement Christophe Ville was viewed as purely a Chamonix man. The Pioneers still finished the season in last place and Morzine-Avoriaz renounced the partnership after a single season.

Aftermath
As the fusion agreement was more protective of Chamonix's interests, Morzine-Avoriaz suffered the most damaging fallout. Chamonix kept the organization's trademarks and visual identity, and most importantly its position in the French hockey rankings. While their twelfth-place finish should have sent them to the lower division, they ended up being saved from relegation by the withdrawal of Dijon from the Ligue Magnus.
Morzine-Avoriaz on the other hand returned to its previous identity, the Penguins, and had to start all over at the country's fourth level, the Division 3, in 2017–18.

Roster 
Updated February 5, 2019.

References 

Ice hockey teams in France
Ice hockey clubs established in 2016
2016 establishments in France
Sport in Haute-Savoie